Grand Street may refer to:

 Grand Street (magazine), an American magazine
 Grand Street (film), a 2013 film starring Kelly McGillis

New York City
Streets
 Grand Street (Manhattan), a street in New York City
 Grand Street (Brooklyn), a street in New York City

Train stations
Grand Street station (IRT Second Avenue Line), in Manhattan, demolished
Grand Street station (IRT Sixth Avenue Line), in Manhattan, demolished
Grand Street station (IRT Third Avenue Line), in Manhattan, demolished
Grand Street station (BMT Canarsie Line), in Brooklyn; serving the  train
Grand Street station (IND Sixth Avenue Line), in Manhattan; serving the  trains
Grand Street station (LIRR Evergreen Branch) a station along the former Evergreen Branch (see Manhattan Beach Branch) of the Long Island Rail Road in Brooklyn from 1868 to 1885
Grand Street station (LIRR Main Line), a former station in Queens along Main Line of the Long Island Rail Road that also served the Rockaway Beach Branch from 1913 to 1925

Services
 Grand Street Shuttle, a former New York City Subway service
 Forty-Second Street and Grand Street Ferry Railroad, a former Manhattan streetcar line

Other
 Grand Street Settlement, a settlement house in Manhattan

See also

 Grand Avenue (disambiguation)
 Grand Boulevard (disambiguation)